Homer Colcord Hubbard (October 14, 1885 – August 7, 1955) was an American football, basketball, and baseball coach. He was the ninth head football coach at Iowa State University in Ames, Iowa, serving for two seasons, from 1913 to 1914, and compiling a record of 8–7. Hubbard was also the school's head basketball coach from 1911 to 1915, tallying a mark of 21–41.

Hubbard later opened up an automotive service business in Sheldon, Iowa. He died at Sheldon in 1955.

Head coaching record

Football

References

External links
 

1885 births
1955 deaths
American football halfbacks
American football quarterbacks
Iowa State Cyclones baseball coaches
Iowa State Cyclones football coaches
Iowa State Cyclones football players
Iowa State Cyclones men's basketball coaches
People from Ida Grove, Iowa
People from Sheldon, Iowa
Coaches of American football from Iowa
Players of American football from Iowa
Baseball coaches from Iowa
Basketball coaches from Iowa